Wayne Hui Wang Fung (born 4 February 1994 in Hong Kong) is a former Hong Kong professional footballer who played as a left back.

Club career
In 2012, Hui signed for Hong Kong First Division club Yokohama FC Hong Kong.

In 2013, Hui signed for another Hong Kong First Division club Yuen Long.

On 29 September 2013, Hui scored his first goal in Hong Kong First Division against Happy Valley, which Yuen Long draws the match 2–2. 

In 2014, Hui signed for Hong Kong First Division club Citizen. He scored 18 goals in 20 games and became the top scorer in the league among the local players. 

In February 2015, Hui went to North American Soccer League club Fort Lauderdale Strikers to have a training for two to three weeks. 

In 2015, Hui signed for Hong Kong Premier League club Rangers. On 13 September 2015, Hui scored his first goal in HKPL against Eastern, which lost the match 1–2.

In June 2016, Hui signed for Southern.

References

External links
 Hui Wang Fung at HKFA
 
 

1994 births
Living people
Hong Kong footballers
Yokohama FC Hong Kong players
Yuen Long FC players
Hong Kong Rangers FC players
Southern District FC players
Hong Kong First Division League players
Hong Kong Premier League players
Association football forwards